Enos M. Mdlongwa, is a Zimbabwean politician and was mayor of Bulawayo from 1983 to 1985.

Ndlovu was a veteran member of PF-ZAPU.

References

Possibly living people
Year of birth missing
Mayors of Bulawayo
20th-century Zimbabwean people